Always Cantare is a 2014 South Korean television program. The first season consists of 4 episodes and aired on tvN from December 5 to 26, 2014. The second season began on June 20, 2015 and airs on Wednesdays at 23:00.

Ratings
In the ratings below, the highest rating for the show will be in red, and the lowest rating for the show will be in blue each year.

Ratings released by AGB Nielsen Korean and TnMS.

References

External links
Always Cantare 1 
Always Cantare 2 

2014 South Korean television series debuts
Korean-language television shows
TVN (South Korean TV channel) original programming
South Korean reality television series
South Korean musical television series